Christian Heinrich Friedrich Peters (September 19, 1813 – July 18, 1890) was a German–American university teacher and astronomer at the Litchfield Observatory of Hamilton College, New York, and a pioneer in the study and visual discovery of asteroids.

Biography 

He was born in Koldenbüttel in Schleswig, then part of Denmark but later part of Germany, and later studied under Carl Friedrich Gauss. His younger brother was the German explorer Wilhelm Peters. Peters spoke many languages and gravitated to Italy at the time of the Italian unification. His association with radical groups brought him to the attention of authorities, and he fled to the Ottoman Empire, where he became a government advisor. At the suggestion of the resident U.S. consul, he emigrated to the United States in 1854.

In 1874, Peters headed a United States Naval Observatory expedition to Queenstown, New Zealand, to observe the Transit of Venus. The visit is marked with a plaque, campaigned for by Sarah Salmond.

In 1878, Peters was elected as a member to the American Philosophical Society.

Working at Hamilton College in Clinton, New York (near Utica), he was a prolific discoverer of asteroids, discovering 48 of them, beginning with 72 Feronia in 1861 and ending with 287 Nephthys in 1889. Besides asteroids, he co-discovered the periodic comet 80P/Peters–Hartley, and also discovered various nebulae and galaxies.

He was involved in litigation in 1889 with his former assistant Charles A. Borst, and the "Great Star-Catalog Case" Peters v. Borst went before the Supreme Court of New York. The judge sided with Peters, but many astronomers and newspapers sided with Borst. Peters died not long after. Following his death, the judgment was ultimately reversed on appeal and a new trial was ordered, but it never took place. The eminent astronomer Simon Newcomb devotes a chapter in his memoirs to Peters, as an object lesson in how great scientific talent and poor ethical standards may coexist in a single individual.

He died July 18, 1890 in Utica. Historian William Sheehan notes, "Peters was found lying, a half-burned cigar at his fingertips, on the doorstep of the building where he lodged; observing cap on his head, he had fallen in the line of duty, on the way to the observatory the night before."

Honors 

Main-belt asteroid 100007 Peters, discovered by Eric Walter Elst at La Silla Observatory in 1988, was named in his memory, based on a suggestion by French amateur astronomer Michel-Alain Combes (born 1942). The asteroid measures approximately 7.5 kilometers in diameter and belongs to the carbonaceous Alauda family. The official  was published by the Minor Planet Center on 5 January 2015.

List of discovered minor planets 

Between 1861 and 1889, C. H. F. Peters discovered 48 asteroids at Litchfield Observatory  at Hamilton College, New York, where he enjoyed the title "Litchfield professor of astronomy".

References

External links 
 Obituary, Astronomische Nachrichten 
 C. H. F. Peters, National Academy of Science
 Michel-Alain Combes, atlantipedia.ie

1813 births
1890 deaths
19th-century  American astronomers
American people of Danish descent
American people of German descent
Discoverers of asteroids

Recipients of the Lalande Prize
People from Nordfriesland